The 1972 Detroit Lions season was their 43rd in the National Football League (NFL). The team improved on their previous season's output of 7–6–1, winning eight games. The team missed the playoffs for the second straight season. It would also be the team's last winning season until 1980

Linebacker Wayne Walker established a new team record for games played at 200. It was also the final season for longtime defensive back Dick LeBeau.

Offseason

NFL Draft 

Notes

 Detroit traded QB Greg Barton to Philadelphia in exchange for the Eagles' second- and third-round selections (40th and 65th) and second-round selection in 1971.
 Detroit traded the 40th selection received from Philadelphia to Atlanta in exchange for RB Paul Gipson.
 Detroit traded its second-round selection (41st) to Atlanta in exchange for CB Rudy Redmond, RB Sonny Campbell and Atlanta's fourth-round selection in 1973.
 Detroit traded its third-round selection (68th) to Philadelphia in exchange for QB Bill Cappleman.
 Detroit traded its fourth-round selection (93rd) to Dallas in exchange for WR Ron Jessie.
 Detroit traded its fifth-round selection (120th) to Los Angeles in exchange for DT Dick Evey.

Roster

Schedule

Season summary

Week 13 at Bills

Standings

See also 
 1972 in Michigan

References 

Detroit Lions seasons
Detroit Lions
Detroit Lions